Jawahar Navodaya Vidyalaya, Kinnaur or locally known as JNV Reckong Peo is a boarding, co-educational school in Kinnaur district of Himachal Pradesh state in India. Navodaya Vidyalayas are funded by the Indian Ministry of Human Resources Development and administered  by Navodaya Vidyalaya Smiti, an autonomous body under the ministry.

History 
The school was established in 1987, and is a part of Jawahar Navodaya Vidyalaya schools. This school is administered and monitored by Chandigarh regional office of Navodaya Vidyalaya Smiti.

Admission 
Admission to JNV Reckong Peo at class VI level is made through selection test conducted by Navodaya Vidyalaya Smiti. The information about test is disseminated and advertised in the district by the office of Kinnaur district magistrate (Collector), who is also chairperson of Vidyalya Management Committee.

Affiliations 
JNV Kinnaur is affiliated to Central Board of Secondary Education with affiliation number 640007. This school follows the curriculum prescribed by CBSE.

See also 

 List of JNV schools
 Jawahar Navodaya Vidyalaya, Sirmaur

References

External links 

 Official Website of JNV Kinnaur

High schools and secondary schools in Himachal Pradesh
Kinnaur
Educational institutions established in 1987
1987 establishments in Himachal Pradesh
Kinnaur district